The 1924 Pacific Tigers football team represented the College of the Pacific—now known as the University of the Pacific—in Stockton, California as an independent during the 1924 college football season. They had been a member of the California Coast Conference (CCC) from 1922 to 1923 and became a charter member of the Far Western Conference (FWC) in 1925. The team was led by fourth-year head coach Erwin Righter and played home games at a field on campus in Stockton. Pacific finished with a record of 6–3 and outscored their opponents 152 to 115 for the season.

Schedule

Notes

References

Pacific
Pacific Tigers football seasons
Pacific Tigers football